Solarman is a fictional comic book superhero that first appeared in 1979, published by Pendulum Press, and then starred in a self-titled two-issue series from Marvel Comics in 1989. Solarman was revived as a title by Scout Comics in 2016. The character was originally created by David Oliphant and Deborah Kalman.

The character is unrelated to other heroes named Solarman, such as the character who appeared in Wham Comics #2 (Centaur Comics, Nov. 1940), the character who appeared in two issues of Superman in 1976, or the Savage Dragon in 2006.

Publication history

Pendulum Press 
Solarman was created in the late 1970s by David Oliphant and Deborah Kalman. Oliphant was the founder and CEO of Pendulum Press, a children's educational publishing company responsible for the Illustrated Classics and Contemporary Motivators series, as well as licensed titles such as Star Wars. The character Solarman was created in response to the 1970s energy crisis as part of an energy awareness program to educate children about alternative fuels. Pendulum's Pendulum Illustrated Original series produced three issues of Solarman:
 Solarman #1: The Beginning (1979) — written by David Oliphant and M. Barbara O'Brien; "adapted" by Linda A. Cadrain and an uncredited artist
 Solarman #2: Day or Nite (1980) — written by David Oliphant and illustrated by Dick Giordano
 Solarman: At the Earth's Core (1980)

Marvel Comics 
Years later, Marvel Comics writer/editor Stan Lee and then-Marvel president Jim Galton contacted Oliphant with the suggestion of publishing a Solarman book through Marvel. Oliphant, Lee, and Margaret Loesch created a new version of Solarman: his secret identity is a teenager named Ben Tucker who aspires to be a comic book artist, and whose adversary is an alien warlord named "Gormagga Kraal." Written by Lee and illustrated by Jim Mooney, this version of Solarman debuted in 1989, and lasted two issues. In 1992 a 22-minute animated Solarman pilot was also produced, based on the Marvel Comics version.

Scout Comics 
Decades later, Oliphant and Kalman decided to revamp and reintroduce the character as a Black superhero, and chose Scout Comics as the publisher. Scout Comics' owner Brendan Deneen reached out to writer/editor Joe Illidge to co-write a new Solarman series with Oliphant, and to edit it. Illidge hired N. Steven Harris (whom he had known since their days at Manhattan's School of Visual Arts) to be the artist on the series, Andrew Dalhouse as the color artist, and Marshall Dillon as the letterer.

Although likeable, writer Illidge characterizes this version of Tucker as "arrogant and angry," one who engages in hacking because he has a chip on his shoulder, and who during the debut storyline, gains superhuman abilities through some type of incident, after which he becomes a fugitive from both a government division and aliens with vested interest in the source of Tucker's powers. According to Deneen, this version of Solarman will incorporate modernized elements from the Marvel version. Harris, who designed the character's look, had never heard of the character until around the time of his hiring, and had not seen his previous appearances, and based his design on images of real people that he and Illidge felt fit the look of a frustrated computer hacker.

Fictional character biography

Pendulum Press 
Solarman is an alien from the Sun who in his secret identity is a professional baseball player for the Los Angeles Dodgers.

Marvel Comics 
Solarman is teenager Benjamin Tucker, who dreams of becoming an artist for Marvel Comics even though his Los Angeles gym-owner father wants him to become a jock. A blue-skinned alien cyborg warlord named Commander Gormagga Kraal tries to use his technology to drain the energy from Earth's sun, but his white-bearded head scientist, Sha-han, refuses and flees to Earth with Kraal's Circlet of Power, which he gives to Ben along with a helpful little robot the boy dubs Beepie.

Thereafter, Ben can expose the Circlet (which is worn on his wrist like a bracelet and cannot be removed) to sunlight and transform into the golden-haired adult Solarman who possesses superhuman strength, is capable of supersonic flight and survival in deep space and can control light, heat, and other forms of energy, although his weakness is that his powers would fade without constant exposure to sunlight, causing him to revert to his powerless teenage form.

Scout Comics 
Ben Tucker is a bullied, biracial teenager living in Brooklyn's East New York neighborhood, with his police officer father, as his mother is deceased. He uses his skills to expose the illegal dealings of white collar criminals and corrupt politicians.

In other media 
In 1988 a 22-minute animated Solarman pilot was also produced, which Oliphant maintained ownership of, since he supplied over $400,000 for its production, with Marvel acting as a licensee. It was released on VHS as a cross promotion tie-in with the first issue of Marvel Comics' adaptation. The pilot finally aired on October 24, 1992, as a special on Fox Kids, a week prior to the debut of the X-Men animated series. According to Oliphant, a major studio offered $15 million to create 64 animated episodes of Solarman, but the studio cancelled this offer soon after on the advice of their consultants, who cautioned that Saturday morning superhero cartoons would soon die out in popularity.

References

External links

Fictional characters introduced in 1979
Marvel Comics extraterrestrial superheroes
Marvel Comics mutates
Marvel Comics characters who can move at superhuman speeds
Marvel Comics characters with superhuman strength
Marvel Comics superheroes
Marvel Comics titles